L.V. Johnson (December 25, 1946 – November 22, 1994) was an American Chicago blues and soul-blues guitarist, singer and songwriter. He is best known for his renditions of "Don't Cha Mess with My Money, My Honey or My Woman"  and "Recipe". He worked with the Soul Children, the Bar-Keys and Johnnie Taylor. Songs he wrote were recorded by Tyrone Davis, Bobby Bland and the Dells. He was the nephew of Elmore James.

Biography
Johnson was born in Chicago, Illinois, and learned to play the guitar from B.B. King.

He was employed by Stax Records as a session musician and played on recordings by the Bar-Kays, Johnnie Taylor, and the Soul Children. His songs "Are You Serious" and "True Love Is Hard to Find" were hit singles for Tyrone Davis. His song  "Country Love" was recorded by Bobby Bland. The Dells reached the Billboard chart with their version of Johnson's "Give Your Baby a Standing Ovation".

Johnson was Davis's accompanist until embarking on a modest solo career in the early 1980s. He recorded for ICA, Phono, and Ichiban Records, but without much commercial success. He was also a co-owner of a steakhouse and nightclub in Chicago.

Johnson died of undisclosed causes in Chicago in November 1994, at the age of 47.

His 1981 song "I Don't Really Care" was sampled by J. Dilla on "Airworks" on Dilla's 2006 album, Donuts. The same track was sampled by Madlib and used in "Chittlins & Pepsi" by Strong Arm Steady (featuring Planet Asia), on Strong Arm Steady's 2010 album, In Search of Stoney Jackson.

Discography

Albums
We Belong Together (Phono Records, 1981)
All Night Party (Sunnyview Records, 1986)
I Really Don't Care (1987)
Cold & Mean (Ichiban, 1989)
I Got the Touch (Ichiban, 1991)
Unclassified (Ichiban, 1992)

See also
List of Chicago blues musicians
List of soul-blues musicians
List of soul musicians

References

External links
Images of Johnson at Google.co.uk/images

1946 births
1994 deaths
Blues musicians from Illinois
Songwriters from Illinois
American blues singers
American soul singers
American blues guitarists
American session musicians
American soul guitarists
American male guitarists
Chicago blues musicians
Electric blues musicians
Singers from Chicago
20th-century American singers
20th-century American guitarists
Guitarists from Chicago
20th-century American male singers
American male songwriters